Sergey Timofeyevich Konenkov (Сергей Тимофеевич Коненков) (also Sergei Konyonkov) (– 9 December 1971) was a Russian and Soviet sculptor. He was often called "the Russian Rodin".

Early life

Konenkov was born in a peasant family, in a village of Karakovichi in Smolensk province. Sergey studied at the Moscow School of Painting, Sculpture and Architecture, graduating in 1897, and at the St. Petersburg Academy of Arts. His diploma work at the Academy - a huge clay statue of Samson tearing the chains - broke most existing laws of academic art and put him at odds with his teachers, who apparently destroyed the work with hammers.

1900-1922 period
He travelled to Italy, France, Egypt, Greece, and Germany.

During the Russian revolution of 1905 Konenkov was with the workers on the barricades, soon after creating portraits of the heroes of the rebellion in Moscow.

When Konenkov visited the house of the art collector Ivan Morozov, an eye-witness account says he was very dismissive: He claimed that the works by Maurice Denis, Manet, Degas and Aristide Maillol were rubbish. Morozov replied that he just loved Konenkov, who replied that he did not care. When Morozov showed Konenkov works by Vrubel and Victor Borisov-Musatov, which he praised, but questioned why they were being hidden in Morozov's bedroom.

Konenkov sold three sculptures to Morozov before the war: A pair entitled Torso made of marble with one created by Richard Guinot, Maillol's assistant, and Konenkov wooden carving entitled Young Woman. During the war he sold Morozov two more.

Konenkov supported the Russian Revolution of 1917. Following the Bolshevik seizure of power Konenkov started work for Narkompros, the new People's Commissariat for Enlightenment. In this capacity he returned to the Morozov mansion to deliver a preservation order for Ivan Morozov's art collection.

Work in US
In 1922 Konenkov married Margarita Ivanovna Vorontsova, and in 1923 they travelled to the United States to take part in the Russian Art Exhibition, which was held in 1924 at the Grand Central Palace. The trip was supposed to last for a few months, but Konenkov stayed in the States for 22 years, living and working in New York City.

In 1928–1929 the sculptor visited Italy to meet and work on a portrait of the Soviet writer Maksim Gorky. He had a personal exhibition in Rome.

During the American period, Konenkov created a large body of work focusing on Bible themes, notably the Apocalypse. He produced works depicting Jesus Christ and the Christian prophets and apostles.

In 1935 he was commissioned by the Princeton University to do a sculpture of Albert Einstein. It is said that Einstein was interested in the work of the Russian sculptor, but was more focused on his wife, Margarita Konenkova. Einstein and Margarita, who also was acquainted with the physicist Robert Oppenheimer, allegedly had a love affair, judging by "nine of the great scientist's apparently genuine love letters, written in 1945 and 1946." There have been allegations that Margarita was working in those years for the Soviet Government, but no concrete evidence has been provided to support the theory.

Return to Russia
Under direct orders from Joseph Stalin in 1945, a ship was sent to New York to bring Konenkov back to the USSR. The sculptor was given a large studio on Gorky street in the centre of Moscow. He "had found favor enough with the regime to be asked to design a plaque commemorating the first anniversary of the October Revolution on the Senate Tower of the Kremlin."

Konenkov created sculptures of Aleksandr Pushkin, Anton Chekhov, Leo Tolstoy, Fyodor Dostoyevsky, Ivan Turgenev, Vladimir Mayakovsky, Konstantin Tsiolkovsky, Vasily Surikov, Johann Bach, Paganini, to name a few. He also made wood carved crosses and other pieces for the Marfo-Mariinsky Convent in Moscow.

Konenkov received numerous Soviet awards, including the golden star of the Hero of Socialist Labour, the order of Lenin and the title Peoples artist of the USSR.

He is buried in Moscow's Novodevichy Convent.

A street in the Northeastern District of Moscow is named after Konenkov.

Works

See also
 List of Russian artists

References

Further reading
The Uncommon Vision of Sergei Konenkov, 1874-1971: A Russian Sculptor and His Times. Marie Turbow Lampard (Editor), John E. Bowlt (Editor). Rutgers University Press (1 March 2001)..

External links

 New York Times - How the F.B.I. tracked the calls of Einstein (features meeting with Konenkov’s wife)
 Letters suggest Einstein affair with spy
 Konenkov's Grandson Arrested For Arson
 Konenkov's grave

1874 births
1971 deaths
Russian male sculptors
Heroes of Socialist Labour
Burials at Novodevichy Cemetery
Soviet sculptors
Full Members of the USSR Academy of Arts
20th-century sculptors
20th-century Russian painters
Russian male painters
20th-century Russian male artists
Moscow School of Painting, Sculpture and Architecture alumni